Schmiedefeld is the name of the following populated places:

 Schmiedefeld (Lichtetal), a municipality in Saalfeld-Rudolstadt district, Thuringia
 Schmiedefeld am Rennsteig, a municipality in Ilm-Kreis district, Thuringia